The Mullard Radio Astronomy Observatory (MRAO) is located near Cambridge, UK and is home to a number of the largest and most advanced aperture synthesis radio telescopes in the world, including the One-Mile Telescope, 5-km Ryle Telescope, and the Arcminute Microkelvin Imager. It was founded by the University of Cambridge and is part of the Cambridge University, Cavendish Laboratories, Astrophysics Department.

History
Radio interferometry started in the mid-1940s on the outskirts of Cambridge, but with funding from the Science Research Council and a corporate donation of £100,000 from Mullard Limited, a leading commercial manufacturer of thermionic valves.

Construction of the Mullard Radio Astronomy Observatory commenced at Lords Bridge Air Ammunition Park, a few kilometres to the west of Cambridge.

The observatory was founded under Martin Ryle of the Radio-Astronomy Group of the Cavendish Laboratory, University of Cambridge and was opened by Sir Edward Victor Appleton on 25 July 1957.  This group is now known as the Cavendish Astrophysics Group.

Location 
The observatory is located a few miles south-west of Cambridge at Harlton on a former ordnance storage site, next to the disused Oxford-Cambridge Varsity railway line.

A portion of the track bed of the railway, running nearly east-west for several miles, was used to form the main part of the "5km" radio-telescope and the Cambridge Low Frequency Synthesis Telescope. Due to this, the reconstruction of the railway line between Oxford and Cambridge will follow a new alignment at this point.

Telescopes

Gallery 
The following photographs (except for the last 2 items) were taken in June 2014:

References

Notes

Sources
Overview | Cavendish Astrophysics
Mullard Radio Astronomy Observatory (MRAO) on Google maps
Subterranea Britannica entry for Lords Bridge Forward Filling Depot (also Air Ammunition Park)
Subterranea Britannica entry for Lords Bridge Station

Radio telescopes
Astronomical observatories in England
Buildings and structures in Cambridgeshire
Cavendish Laboratory